December 8 - Eastern Orthodox liturgical calendar - December 10

All fixed commemorations below celebrated on December 22 by Eastern Orthodox Churches on the Old Calendar.

For December 9th, Orthodox Churches on the Old Calendar commemorate the Saints listed on November 26.

Feasts
 The Conception by St. Anna of the Most Holy Theotokos.

Saints
 Prophetess Anna (Hannah), mother of the Prophet Samuel (1100 BC) 
 Martyr Easios, tortured and beheaded (c. 284-305)
 Saint Bassa (Vassa), Patrician and Igumenia of a female monastery in Jerusalem, where she also founded the Monastery of St Menas, whose Abbot was the Bishop of Jamnia, Stephanos (5th century) (see also December 7 - Slavonic)
 Martyr Sositheus of Persia, by the sword (553)
 Saint Sophronius the Archbishop of Cyprus (6th century)  (see also: December 8)
 Martyr Nerses of Persia, by the sword.
 Martyr Isaac.
 Saint Stephen “the New Light” of Constantinople (912)

Pre-Schism Western saints
 Saint Syrus of Pavia, first Bishop and main patron-saint of Pavia in Italy (c. 1st century)
 Virgin-martyr Valerie of Limoges (Valeria of Aquitaine), by tradition she was converted by St Martial of Limoges in France and beheaded (1st or 3rd century)
 Virgin-martyr Leocadia (Locaie), in Toledo, Spain (c. 303)
 Saint Proculus of Verona, Bishop of Verona in Italy, a confessor during the persecution of Diocletian, reposed in peace (c. 320)
 Martyrs Peter, Successus, Bassian, Primitivus and 20 other Companions, in North Africa.
 Saint Cyprian, a monk at Périgueux in France, who ended his life as a hermit on the banks of the Dordogne (586)
 Saint Restitutus, Bishop of Carthage in North Africa and Martyr.
 Saint Balda, third Abbess of Jouarre in France (7th century)
 Saint Budoc (Budeaux), born in Brittany, became Abbot of Youghal in Ireland, then Bishop of Dol in Brittany (7th century?)  (see also: December 8)
 Saint Ethelgiva (Æthelgifu), the daughter of King Alfred the Great, became first Abbess of Shaftesbury (896)
 Saint Wolfeius, a hermit at St Benet Hulme in Norfolk in England (c. 1000)
 Saint Enguerrammus (Angilram) 'the Wise', monk and Abbot of Saint Riquier in France (1045)

Post-Schism Orthodox saints
 Hieromonk Anthymus the Athonite, "Fool for Christ"

New martyrs and confessors
 New Hieromartyr Vladimir Vinogradov, priest (1919)
 New Hieromartyr Vladimir Dzhurinsky, priest and Virgin-martyr Ephrosia Dzhurinsky (1920)
 New Hieromartyrs Basil Yagodin, Protopresbyter, and Alexander Buravtsev, priests (1937)
 New Martyr Priest Sergius Mechiev of Moscow (1941)
 New-Martyr Archpriest Paul Levashov of Gomel.

Other commemorations
 Commemoration of the Founding of the Church of the Resurrection at Jerusalem (335)
 Repose of Archimandrite Theodosius of Tismana and Sophroniev Monasteries, fellow-struggler of St. Paisius Velichkovsky (1802)
 Repose of Elder Anthimus the Bulgarian on Mt. Athos (1867)
 Icon of the Most Holy Theotokos "Unexpected Joy".

Icon gallery

Notes

References

Sources 
 December 9/22. Orthodox Calendar (PRAVOSLAVIE.RU).
 December 22 / December 9. HOLY TRINITY RUSSIAN ORTHODOX CHURCH (A parish of the Patriarchate of Moscow).
 December 8. OCA - The Lives of the Saints.
 The Autonomous Orthodox Metropolia of Western Europe and the Americas (ROCOR). St. Hilarion Calendar of Saints for the year of our Lord 2004. St. Hilarion Press (Austin, TX). p. 92.
 December 9. Latin Saints of the Orthodox Patriarchate of Rome.
 The Roman Martyrology. Transl. by the Archbishop of Baltimore. Last Edition, According to the Copy Printed at Rome in 1914. Revised Edition, with the Imprimatur of His Eminence Cardinal Gibbons. Baltimore: John Murphy Company, 1916. pp. 378–379.
Greek Sources
 Great Synaxaristes:  9 ΔΕΚΕΜΒΡΙΟΥ. ΜΕΓΑΣ ΣΥΝΑΞΑΡΙΣΤΗΣ.
  Συναξαριστής. 9 Δεκεμβρίου. ECCLESIA.GR. (H ΕΚΚΛΗΣΙΑ ΤΗΣ ΕΛΛΑΔΟΣ). 
Russian Sources
  22 декабря (9 декабря). Православная Энциклопедия под редакцией Патриарха Московского и всея Руси Кирилла (электронная версия). (Orthodox Encyclopedia - Pravenc.ru).
  9 декабря (ст.ст.) 22 декабря 2013 (нов. ст.). Русская Православная Церковь Отдел внешних церковных связей. (DECR).

December in the Eastern Orthodox calendar